EKP may refer to:

Political parties 
 Communist Party of Estonia, defunct
 Jewish Communist Party (Poalei Zion), defunct

Other uses 
 Ekpeye language